Charles Francis "Cotton" Nash (born July 24, 1942) is an American former Major League Baseball (MLB) outfielder and National Basketball Association (NBA) forward.

Basketball career
Born in Jersey City, New Jersey, Nash played collegiately for Adolph Rupp's legendary University of Kentucky Wildcats basketball team, where he was named a first-team All-American in 1964. He went on to play in the NBA for the Los Angeles Lakers and the San Francisco Warriors during the 1964–65 NBA season. He had his most success in the American Basketball Association with the Kentucky Colonels, averaging 8.5 points per game, 4.9 rebounds per game, and 1.2 assists per game.

Baseball career
While at the University of Kentucky, Nash also played on the Kentucky baseball team. In 1963, he played collegiate summer baseball with the Cotuit Kettleers of the Cape Cod Baseball League and was named a league all-star. He went on to appear in 13 games over three MLB seasons with the Chicago White Sox and Minnesota Twins. One of those games was with the White Sox on September 10, 1967, in the ninth inning of Joe Horlen's no-hitter; he replaced Ken Boyer at first base and recorded all three putouts in the inning.

Multi-sport legacy
Nash is one of 13 multi-sport athletes to have played in both the NBA and Major League Baseball. The thirteen are: Danny Ainge, Frank Baumholtz, Hank Biasatti, Gene Conley, Chuck Connors, Dave DeBusschere, Dick Groat, Steve Hamilton, Mark Hendrickson, Nash, Ron Reed, Dick Ricketts and Howie Schultz.

References

External links

College career stats at BigBlueHistory.net
Cotton Nash Biography from Society for American Baseball Research (SABR)

1942 births
Living people
All-American college men's basketball players
American men's basketball players
Baseball players from Jersey City, New Jersey
Basketball players from Jersey City, New Jersey
Chicago White Sox players
Cotuit Kettleers players
Hawaii Islanders players
Kentucky Colonels players
Kentucky Wildcats baseball players
Kentucky Wildcats men's basketball players
Los Angeles Lakers draft picks
Los Angeles Lakers players
Major League Baseball outfielders
Minnesota Twins players
Parade High School All-Americans (boys' basketball)
San Diego Padres (minor league) players
San Francisco Warriors players
Small forwards